The Master of Frankfurt (1460–c. 1533) was a Flemish Renaissance painter active in Antwerp between about 1480 and 1520. Although he probably never visited Frankfurt am Main, his name derives from two paintings commissioned from patrons in that city, the Holy Kinship (c. 1503) in the Frankfurt Historical Museum and a Crucifixion in the Städel museum.

He is one of many anonymous artists identifiable by their painting style but not by name. The Master of Frankfurt is, however, often thought to be a Hendrik van Wueluwe, an artist famous in Antwerp around the same time as the anonymous painter but otherwise unconnected to any paintings.

His dated Self portrait of the artist with his wife in its original frame (1496; Royal Museum of Fine Arts, Antwerp) reveals that the artist was 36 years old at the time it was made, as well as a member of Antwerp's Guild of St. Luke.

If he is the same artist as Van Wueluwe, then he was also dean of the guild six times. Attributed paintings include his self-portrait, the Festival of the Archers (1493; Royal Museum of Fine Arts, Antwerp), and the two paintings in Frankfurt.

The Master of Frankfurt is also known for painting numerous copies after earlier Netherlandish painters such as Rogier van der Weyden and Hugo van der Goes for the open market and for developing, around 1500 in Antwerp, a new artistic style alongside his more famous contemporary Quentin Metsys.

Museum collections 
 Metropolitan Museum of Art, New York; Master of Frankfurt, The Adoration of the Christ Child, ca. 1496-1502
 Musée du Louvre, Paris; Master of Frankfurt, Vierge à l'Enfant dans un paysage, ca. 1514
 Thyssen-Bornemisza Museum, Madrid; Maestro of Frankfurt, La Sagrada Familia (The Holy Family), ca. 1508
 Museo National de Prado, Madrid; Maestro de Francfort, Sagrada Familia con ángel músico, Santa Catalina de Alejandría, Santa Bárbara, ca. 1510-1520 (Video: Restoration of the Master of Frankfurt triptych, by María Antonia López Asiaín)
 Detroit Institute of Arts, Michigan; Master of Frankfurt, The Virgin Enthroned
 Kunsthistorisches Museum, Vienna, Austria; Master of Frankfurt, Triptych, Adoration of the Magi, the Nativity (left) and the Circumcision (right), c.1512
 Mauritshuis Royal Picture Gallery, The Hague; Meester van Frankfurt, Saint Christopher, ca. 1500, Saint Catherine, 1510–1520, and Saint Barbara, 1510-1520
 National Gallery of Art, Washington D.C.; Master of Frankfurt, Saint Anne with the Virgin and the Christ Child, ca.1511-15
 Museu Nacional d'Art de Catalunya (MNAC), Barcelona; Mestre de Frankfurt, Triptych of the Baptism of Christ, 1500-1520
 National Museums Liverpool, Liverpool, UK; Master of Frankfurt, The Holy Family with Music Making Angels, 1510-1520
 Norton Museum of Art, West Palm Beach, Florida; Master of Frankfurt, The Lamentation
 San Diego Museum of Art, California; Master of Frankfurt, Mystic Marriage of Saint Catherine with Saints and Angles, ca. 1500-1510
 The Walters Art Museum, Maryland; Master of Frankfurt, Virgin and Child Enthroned, ca. 1515-1520
 The Wilanów Palace Museum (Muzeum Pałac w Wilanowie) Poland; Master of Frankfurt, Madonna and Child crowned by two angels, ca. 1490s
 Historical Museum (Historisches Museum), Frankfurt, Meister von Frankfurt, St. Anne Altarpiece, ca 1505, Two Saints: St. Odilia and St. Cecilia, ca. 1505
 The McNay Museum, San Antonio, Texas; Master of Frankfurt, St. Barbara and St. Catherine
 Queensland Art Gallery, Brisbane, Australia; Master of Frankfurt, Virgin and Child with Saint James the Pilgrim, Saint Catherine and the Donor with Saint Peter, ca. 1496

Selected works

References

External links 
 
 Entry for the Master of Frankfurt in the Union List of Artist Names
Fifteenth- to eighteenth-century European paintings: France, Central Europe, the Netherlands, Spain, and Great Britain, a collection catalog fully available online as a PDF, which contains material on the Master of Frankfurt (cat. no. 18)
 Agence photographique de la réunion des Musées nationaux

1460 births
1530s deaths
Renaissance painters
Frankfurt, Master of
Painters from Antwerp